UDS may refer to:

 Ubuntu Developer Summit, for Ubuntu Linux
 Ultra Deep Survey, deepest near-infrared astronomical survey
 Unified Diagnostic Services, a vehicle communication standard used for vehicle diagnostics
 Union Deportiva Salamanca, a Spanish football team
 Unique Development Studios, a video and computer game developer based in Sweden
 United Drapery Stores, former UK retail group
 Unix domain socket, data communications endpoint
 Université de Sherbrooke (UdS) Sherbrooke University
 University of Strasbourg (French: Université de Strasbourg, Unistra or UDS)
 Uranus Dark Spot
 Urban Dance Squad, former Dutch rap rock band
University for Development Studies, a University in Ghana

See also
 UD (disambiguation) for the singular of "UDs"
 DS (disambiguation) for micro-DS (uDS / μDS)
 D (disambiguation) for micro-D's (uD's / μDs)